The Fire Mummies of the Philippines, also known as the Kabayan Mummies, Benguet Mummies, or Ibaloi Mummies, are a group of mummies found along the mountain slopes of  Kabayan, a town in the northern part of the Philippines. They were made from as early as 2000 BCE. Today, they remain in natural caves and a museum in Kabayan.

Description 

Scientists believe that the Fire Mummies were created by the Ibaloi between 1200 and 1500 CE in five towns in Benguet and buried in caves. Others believe that the process of mummification began in 2000 BCE. What makes the Fire Mummies unique is their process of mummification. That mummification began shortly before a person died, where he would digest a very salty drink. After his death, his corpse was washed and set over a fire in a seated position, thus drying the fluids. Smoke from tobacco was blown into the mouth to dry the body's inside and internal organs. Eventually, herbs were rubbed into the body. Mummified bodies are then placed in a coffin made of pinewood and laid to rest in rock shelters, natural caves or man made burial niches.

Discovery 

When the Fire Mummies were uncovered in the early 20th century by Westerners (the mummies have been known to local communities for hundreds of years), many of them were stolen, because the caves were mostly unprotected. Because of this, Monument Watch, a nonprofit organization, declared the site as one of the 100 most endangered sites in the world.

Today 

After logging operations intensified in the area, the location of many caves became known. Unfortunately this has led to looting, as unconscientious visitors have been eager to leave their mark, including graffiti, on the Kabayan mummies. The Kabayan Mummies were listed in the 1998 World Monuments Watch by the World Monuments Fund. Funding through American Express was used for emergency conservation and the creation of a comprehensive management plan. Additionally, local authorities from surrounding municipalities collaborated in cultural awareness campaign to introduce the Mummies to Filipinos. Tourist facilities were also constructed in order to control visitation and prevent harmful intrusions.

The Fire Mummies remain in natural caves with relatively small security and have been designated as one of the 100 world's most endangered heritage sites. Officials know 50-80 other mummies, but they will not give their locations because of their fear of vandalism. A small museum in Kabayan, Benguet also displays a few mummies.

Declarations 
The Kabayan Mummy Burial Caves are listed as National Cultural Treasures by the National Museum of the Philippines pursuant to Presidential Decree No. 374. It is also under consideration as a UNESCO World Heritage Site. Scholars are also pushing for the inclusion of the mummy burial caves in neighboring Buguias town in the Kabayan Mummy Burial Caves nomination of the Philippines in the UNESCO Tentative List. The caves in Buguias is home to one of Benguet's folk hero, Apo Anno. The burial caves in Kabayan and Buguias will collectively be called as the Benguet Mummy Burial Caves or Mummy Burial Caves in Kabayan and Buguias.

See also
 List of World Heritage Sites in the Philippines
 List of World Heritage Sites in Southeast Asia
 List of World Heritage Sites

References

Further reading

External links 
Kabayan Branch, National Museum of the Philippines
 Fire Mummies of the Philippines

Mummies
Archaeology of death
Culture of Benguet
Tourist attractions in Benguet
World Heritage Tentative List for the Philippines